Discipline is the third album by the Norwegian death metal band Cadaver, but was released under the moniker Cadaver Inc. It is particularly notable for the vocal contributions of two Norwegian black metal figures - Bård "Faust" Eithun (ex-Emperor) and Fenriz (Darkthrone). Design and Illustration were by Justin Bartlett.

Track listing
  "Primal"   – 2:27  
  "Deliverance"   – 3:10  
  "Murderhead"   – 3:14  
  "Rupture"   – 3:21  
  "Die Like This"   – 3:42  
  "Point Zero"   – 4:10  
  "Killtech"   – 3:40  
  "Reptile Robots"   – 3:02  
  "Manic"   – 3:24  
  "Snapper Organs"   – 5:19  
  "Discipline"   – 3:29

Credits
Apollyon - Vocals  
Neddo - Guitar
L.J. Balvaz - Bass
Czral - Drums

References

Cadaver (band) albums
2001 albums
Earache Records albums